ChemistrySelect  is a peer-reviewed scientific journal covering all areas of chemistry and adjacent fields. It is published by Wiley-VCH on behalf of Chemistry Europe.

Abstracting and indexing 
The journal is indexed in the Science Citation Index Expanded and Scopus.

According to the Journal Citation Reports, the journal has a 2021 impact factor of 2.307, ranking it 119th out of 179 journals in the category "Chemistry, Multidisciplinary".

References

External links 

Chemistry Europe academic journals
Chemistry journals
Publications established in 2016
English-language journals
Wiley-VCH academic journals
Journals published between 27 and 51 times per year